UDP-N-acetylglucosamine kinase (UNAG kinase, zeta toxin, toxin PezT, ATP:UDP-N-acetyl-D-glucosamine 3'-phosphotransferase) is an enzyme with systematic name ATP:UDP-N-acetyl-alpha-D-glucosamine 3'-phosphotransferase. This enzyme catalyses the following chemical reaction

 ATP + UDP-N-acetyl-alpha-D-glucosamine  ADP + UDP-N-acetyl-alpha-D-glucosamine 3'-phosphate

The phosphorylation of UDP-N-acetyl-D-glucosamine causes the inhibition of enzyme EC 2.5.1.7, UDP-N-acetylglucosamine 1-carboxyvinyltransferase.

These enzymes are found as part of plasmid-encoded and chromosomal bacterial toxin-antitoxin systems.

References

External links 
 

EC 2.7.1